Bombay Talkie is a 1970 film by Merchant Ivory Productions, with a screenplay by Ruth Prawer Jhabvala and James Ivory.

Plot
Lucia Lane (Jennifer Kendal) is a British author who is researching the Bollywood film industry. She falls in love and has an affair with Vikram (Shashi Kapoor), a famous Bollywood actor. The plot is complicated by the fact that Vikram is married, and his friend, Hari (Zia Mohyeddin), is in love with Lucia.

Cast 

 Shashi Kapoor as Vikram
 Jennifer Kendal as Lucia
 Zia Mohyeddin as Hari
 Aparna Sen as Mala
 Utpal Dutt as Bose
 Florence Ezekiel (Nadira) as Anjana Devi
 Pinchoo Kapoor as Swamiji
 Helen as Heroine in Gold
 Usha Iyer as Cabaret Singer
 Ruby Myers as Gopal Ma
 Prayag Raj as Director
 Jalal Agha as Young Man
 Anwar Ali as Young Man
 Mohan Nadkarni as Young Man
 Sukhdev as Man at Bar

Soundtrack

Trivia
The film's song "Typewriter, Tip, Tip" (Music: Shankar–Jaikishan, Lyrics: Hasrat Jaipuri) and the opening credits theme were used in the Wes Anderson film The Darjeeling Limited and on Geoff Lloyd's Hometime Show.

Amitabh Bachchan played a minuscule role in the film. The actor confessed in an interview that Shashi Kapoor chided him for doing the role as he foresaw greater potential in Bachchan.

References

External links

Merchant Ivory overview
Blogpost on the film's title sequence

1970 films
1970 romantic drama films
English-language Indian films
Films set in Mumbai
Merchant Ivory Productions films
Films directed by James Ivory
Films with screenplays by Ruth Prawer Jhabvala
Films about filmmaking
Films scored by Shankar–Jaikishan
Films with screenplays by James Ivory
Indian romantic drama films
1970s English-language films